Operation Bayonet Lightning was a military operation during the early stages of the Iraq War, that was held to capture weapons, materials, and people who posed a threat against coalition forces. The joint operation between Iraq and the United States, lasted approximately 16 hours, and was conducted on 2 December 2003. 1,200 soldiers from the 173rd Airborne Brigade, the 4th Infantry Division, and Iraqi military participated. Operation Bayonet Lightning was concentrated on Al Hawija, Iraq, and the village of Rashad, Iraq, sixty kilometers, or thirty-seven miles, to the south of Kirkuk, Iraq.

Overview
During Operation Bayonet Lightning, coalition forces located and confiscated sixty-two AK-47 assault rifles, two hundred rounds of AK-47 ammunition, one rocket propelled grenade launcher and two improvised explosive device-making kits.

Twenty six individuals were captured, including three targeted individuals, Saad Mohammed ad-Douri, the private secretary of Izzat Ibrahim ad-Douri, and Hamid Saad, a senior official of Saddam Hussein's former ruling Ba'ath Party in charge of youth and student affairs, and a former general of the disbanded Iraqi Army.

Operation Bayonet Lightning followed Operation Rifles Blitz and was followed by Operation Bulldog Mammoth.

See also

Iraq War-related articles
Iraq War
List of coalition military operations of the Iraq War

Iraq-related articles
Iraq
History of Iraq

Terrorism and insurgency-related articles
Terrorism
Iraqi insurgency
Suicide bombings in Iraq since 2003
Bombings and terrorist attacks of the Iraq War
Terrorist attacks of the Iraq War

Casualties-related articles
United States casualties of war
Post-traumatic stress disorder
Iraq Body Count project
Violence against academics in post-invasion Iraq

References

External links
Defend America News

Military operations of the Iraq War involving the United States
Military operations of the Iraq War involving Iraq
Military operations of the Iraq War in 2003
Iraqi insurgency (2003–2011)